Irmakköy (also: Irmak) is a village in the Pazar District, Rize Province, in Black Sea Region of Turkey. Its population is 578 (2021). Besides the main village Irmakköy, it contains 11 hamlets, including Adakli (Laz name: P'açilati).

History 
According to list of villages in Laz language book (2009), name of the village is Mamakivat, which means "Mamaki village". Most villagers are ethnically Laz.

Geography

References

Villages in Pazar District, Rize
Laz settlements in Turkey